Petrik is a name which can serve as a given name and as a surname.

Notable people with the given name:
Petrik Sander (born 1960), German football player and manager

Notable people with the surname:
Karen Petrik (born 1997), American rower
Lajos Petrik (1851–1932), Hungarian chemist, ceramist and teacher
Larisa Petrik (born 1949), Soviet gymnast
Nikolas Petrik (born 1984), Austrian ice hockey player
Stanislav Petrík (born 1977), Slovak ice hockey player
Viktor Petrik  (born 1946), Russian businessman